The 1999 Korea Super Prix was the inaugural Korea Super Prix race held on the streets of Changwon on November 28, 1999. It was won by British driver Darren Manning for TOM'S.

Drivers and teams

Classification

Qualifying
 Qualifying was split into two sessions, for even-numbered cars and odd-numbered cars. The fastest car from the two sessions lined up on pole position, with the fastest from the other session lining up second. The rest of the cars lined up in session order, regardless of which session produced faster times than the other.

Race

Leg 1

Leg 2

Combined

See also
 Korea Super Prix

References

Korea Super Prix
Korea Super Prix
Korea Super Prix